The velar lateral ejective affricate is a rare type of consonantal sound, used in some spoken languages.

It is found in two forms in Archi, a Northeast Caucasian language of Dagestan, plain  and labialized . It is further forward than velars in most languages, and might better be called prevelar. Archi also has voiceless (pulmonic) variants of its lateral affricates, several voiceless lateral fricatives, and a voiced lateral fricative at the same place of articulation, but no alveolar lateral fricatives or affricates.

In the latter, it contrasts with palatal , as in  'to cradle'. In fact, the velar ejective is reported to be lateral, or to have a lateral allophone, in various languages of Africa which have clicks, including Taa, various varieties of !Kung, Gǁana (including Gǀui dialect), Khwe (ǁAni dialect), and Khoekhoe.

Features
Features of the velar lateral ejective affricate:

Occurrence

See also
 List of phonetic topics

References

External links
 

Affricates
Lateral consonants
Velar consonants
Ejectives
Oral consonants